Vrbovac may refer to:

Bosnia and Herzegovina
 Vrbovac, Bosnia and Herzegovina, a village

Croatia
 Vrbovac, Croatia, a village near Daruvar

Kosovo
 Vrbovac, Kosovo, a village in Klokot municipality

Serbia
 Vrbovac (Blace), a village
 Vrbovac (Boljevac), a village
 Vrbovac (Smederevo), a village
 Vrbovac (Sokobanja), a village

See also
 Vrbovec (disambiguation)